Znaur District (Qornisis Raioni; , Znauyry rajon; , Znaurskiy rayon) is one of the districts of South Ossetia. It is located in the southwestern part of South Ossetia. Znauri  is the administrative center of the district.

International status
According to administrative division of Georgia, its territory is part of Kareli Municipality of Shida Kartli.

Notes

References

 
Districts of South Ossetia